The Cumbria County History Trust (CCHT) is a charity launched in May 2010 to coordinate and gather resources for the Victoria County History of Cumbria project, a collaborative community project created to research and write the histories of all parts of Cumbria, and to make historical information generally available, within the framework and standards of the Victoria County History of England. Any interested individual, history and heritage society, museum, or commercial organisation can join CCHT.

General
The aim of CCHT is to initiate a step-change in the awareness and understanding of Cumbria's local historical heritage, by harnessing the enthusiasm for local history which exists widely across Cumbria, and pooling expertise.  Its ultimate aim is to write the history of every town and village in England.  To date, a team of over 100 volunteers from across Cumbria has compiled brief histories for each of the 348 parishes/townships in the county, using the Civil Parishes as they existed around 1900. Edited versions of these histories can be found on each place page of on the CCHT website and have been published as a book, Cumbria: An Historical Gazetteer. In addition, a smaller core of volunteers has been researching and writing full parish/township histories, in the standard style of the Victoria County History. Please see the Completed Draft Histories section on the project website for more details about their progress. Our first VCH parish history was published in March 2018 and covers the three fellside villages of Kirkowald, Staffield and Renwick. See Richard Brockington and Sarah Rose, The Victoria History of Cumberland: Kirkoswald and Renwick (University of London, 2019).

Early work
No VCH town or village histories had been published for the historic counties of Cumberland and Westmorland before the VCH Cumbria project was launched in 2010; the only parts of Cumbria previously to have been researched in detail by the VCH were those parts which were formerly in Lancashire.  The story of the early attempts to publish a VCH for Cumberland and Westmorland has been told by John Beckett in a paper in the Transactions of the Cumberland and Westmorland Antiquarian and archaeological Society, New Series, vol XI, (2011) pp. 207–225

Lancashire
The Furness and Cartmel areas (Lonsdale North of the Sands) were covered in VCH Lancashire, Volume VIII (published in 1910)

Cumberland
Two introductory volumes were published in the early twentieth century, Volume 1 (1901), which covered Early Man, Pre-Norman Remains, Introduction to and Texts of the Cumberland Domesday, Early Pipe Rolls, and Testa de Nevill and Volume II (1905) which covered Political History, Industries, Sport Ancient and Modern, Forestry. The first VCH parish history of Cumberland was published in March 2018 – Richard Brockington and Sarah Rose, The Victoria History of Cumberland: Kirkoswald and Renwick (University of London, 2019).

Westmorland
Nothing has been published to date

Resources 

The CCHT website aims to be the major online source for the history of Cumbria. Included among the many resources on there is a full transcript of Cumbrian Census figures from 1801 to 2001, by ward. Each place page contains links to a number of place-specific sources, including the most relevant papers in the CWAAS Transactions. There is a range of images available for download from the Gallery, including images taken from:

 Hutchinson's History of the County of Cumberland, Vol 1 1794
 Sketches and photographs from sketchbook compiled by Joseph Hall (1839–1899) of Parkgate, Waverton: Cumbria Archive Centre, Carlisle, DX 1065/50
 Aqua-tints and engravings from Thomas West's "A Guide to the Lakes in Cumberland, Westmorland and Lancashire", 6th edn, 1796
 Aqua-tints and engravings from Thomas West's "A Guide to the Lakes in Cumberland, Westmorland and Lancashire", 6th edn, 1796
 Illustrations by A Reginald Smith from W G Collingwood 'The Lake Counties', (New Edition 1932)
 Old Maps of Cumbria Gallery: extracts of old printed maps showing Cumbria. All the maps illustrated are in private ownership and there are no copyright restrictions on their use
 Engravings from Thomas Pennant's Tour from Downing to Alston Moor 1801

Project Direction 

All the work on the Victoria County History of Cumbria project is being done by volunteers, under the overall direction of Dr Fiona Edmonds Director of the Regional Heritage Centre at Lancaster University and with volunteer guidance and support provided by Dr Sarah Rose, assistant editor.

Volunteers are provided training to ensure that the high standards of scholarship expected from the Victoria County History are maintained, and that the output, both Digests and Draft Histories, provides a factual, reliable and authoritative work of reference for everyone with an interest in the history of their town or village – and possibly their family too.

A practical guide for volunteers contributing to the Victoria County History (Cumbria) Project has been published and is freely available. It contains guidance on all aspects of researching and writing the history of a parish or township for the VCH, drawing attention to sources and themes of particular relevance to the history of local communities in Cumbria.

Trustees 
The Cumbria County History Trust (CCHT) is a registered charity (Charity Registration Number 1137379).  The charitable aims of the Trust are:

 to further the education of the public in the history and heritage of the County of Cumbria and its communities and to promote and foster public knowledge, understanding and appreciation of the history of the area in general.
 to undertake research into the history and heritage of the County of Cumbria and its communities and to disseminate the useful results of such research for the public benefit.

CCHT has a current membership of 138 individuals and 12 societies. The project is managed by the Board of Trustees, chaired by Bryan Gray, CBE.

The other trustees are:
 Richard Platt [Treasurer]
 Tiffany Hunt [ Secretary]
 David Galbraith [University of Cumbria] 
 Robert Baxter [Cumbria Archive Service]
 Professor Sir James Underwood
 Richard Brockington
 Professor John Garside
 Marion McClintock, MBE, BA 
 Lorna Mullett
 Professor Angus Winchester
 Dr William Dermot Shannon [CWAAS] 
 Professor Keith Stringer, MA, PhD, FRHistS, FSA [Lancaster University] 
 Timothy Sykes
 Jane Penman

Patrons and Sponsors 
This project is part financed by the Cumberland & Westmorland Antiquarian & Archaeological Society

The Trusts Patrons are:

 Sir Christian Bonington CBE
 Sir James Cropper KCVO
 Lord Inglewood

The Trust is supported by the following organisations:

 Cumbria County Council
 Cumbria Local History Federation
 Cumberland & Westmorland Antiquarian & Archaeological Society
 Diocese of Carlisle
 Friends of Cumbria Archives
 Lake District National Park Authority
 National Trust North West Region
 Society of Antiquaries of Newcastle upon Tyne
 Rural Development Programme for England (RDPE)
 University of Cumbria
 University of Lancaster

References

External links 
 Lancaster University – Official website
Dr Fiona Edmonds – Lancaster University
 Dr Sarah Rose – Lancaster University

Cumbria County History Trust 

History of Cumbria
Organisations based in Cumbria
History organisations based in the United Kingdom
Victoria County History